The Women's 800 metres event at the 2013 European Athletics U23 Championships was held in Tampere, Finland, at Ratina Stadium on 11 and 12 July.

Medalists

Results

Final
12 July 2013 

Intermediate times:
400m: 1:02.65 Olha Lyakhova 
600m: 1:32.17 Mirela Lavric

Heats
Qualified: First 2 in each heat (Q) and 2 best performers (q) advance to the Final

Summary

Details

Heat 1
11 July 2013 / 17:00

Intermediate times:
400m: 1:03.27 Anastasiya Tkachuk 
600m: 1:33.79 Anastasiya Tkachuk

Heat 2
11 July 2013 / 17:08

Intermediate times:
400m: 1:02.40 Olha Lyakhova 
600m: 1:33.21 Olha Lyakhova

Heat 3
11 July 2013 / 17:16

Intermediate times:
400m: 1:01.27 Ayvika Malanova 
600m: 1:32.37 Ayvika Malanova

Participation
According to an unofficial count, 23 athletes from 16 countries participated in the event.

References

800 metres
800 metres at the European Athletics U23 Championships